Callitriche hermaphroditica (vernacular name: autumnal water-starwort) is a species of flowering plant belonging to the family Plantaginaceae.

Its native range is Subarctic and Temperate Northern Hemisphere.

References

hermaphroditica